Tarġa Battery is an artillery battery on the boundary between St. Paul's Bay and Mosta, Malta. It was built in 1887 by the British as part of the Victoria Lines. The battery is now in the hands of the Mosta Local Council, who intend to restore it and open it to the public.

History

Tarġa Battery was built in 1887 as part of the North West Front (later renamed the Victoria Lines), between the Dwejra Lines and Fort Mosta. The battery was built to protect the defensive line's low escarpment at Tarġa Gap, and it was meant to defend the area from enemy batteries which could be constructed on Bidnija Hill.

The battery has a pentagonal shape, and it contains a caponier, casemated gun emplacements, an escarpment and a ditch. An infantry redoubt was built at the rear of the battery. Some alterations were made to the structure between the 1890s and the first half of the 20th century.

In 1888, when it was still under construction, the battery's design was criticized by a number of British engineers. The decision was taken to complete the battery, but it never received its intended armament of four 64-pounder RML guns. The entire Victoria Lines were of dubious defensive value, and the entire system of fortifications (with the exception of Fort Madalena and Fort Binġemma) was decommissioned in 1907.

The former battery was then used as a magazine or storage area, and it was used for training and storage by the Civil Defence just after World War II.

Present day
The Land Ministry passed the battery to the Mosta Local Council, who cleaned it up along with the Mosta Scout Group in May 2012. The site is now the Mosta Scout Group's campsite and activity centre.

The battery

References

External links

YouTube video showing a 3D model of Tarġa Battery

Batteries in Malta
St. Paul's Bay
Mosta
British fortifications in Malta
Buildings and structures completed in 1887
Limestone buildings in Malta
19th-century fortifications